Armaxa, also known as Armaza, was a town of ancient Cappadocia, inhabited in Roman times. 

Its site is located near Gemerek, Asiatic Turkey.

References

Populated places in ancient Cappadocia
Former populated places in Turkey
Roman towns and cities in Turkey
History of Sivas Province